Glasgow Perthshire Charitable Society is a charity registered in Scotland.

The Society
The Glasgow Perthshire Charitable Society was founded in 1835, and is one of the oldest charities in Scotland still in existence. Today it is generally referred to as "The Glasgow Perthshire". The Society is based in Glasgow, though its directors and members reside in various parts of Scotland.

Charity Registration
The Society is registered with the Office of the Scottish Charity Regulator (OSCR) with Registered Charity No. SC009576. The Society's entry  on the OSCR web site contains basic information and financial details of the Society. The Society has been a registered charity since 7th May 1895 (although it was founded sixty years earlier in 1835).

Mission and Remit
Today the Society primarily provides bursaries to students from the county of Perthshire attending one of Glasgow's universities or colleges. Historically, the Society provided grants and pensions to senior citizens and others from Perthshire who lived in Glasgow and met the appropriate criteria.

Board of Directors
The Society is run by the Board of Directors, chaired by the Preses (an old Scots word meaning Presiding Officer - for example see Preses o the Scots Pairlament), and comprising a Treasurer, Secretary, and ordinary board members who take on duties such as Bursary Coordinator and Grants Coordinator. The Board run the Society in their spare time and receive no remuneration for their work.

History
The Society was formed in 1835 originally to provide assistance to those whose had moved to Glasgow from Perthshire seeking employment, and had fallen on hard times. The Society has frequently been mentioned in the press over the years, with some examples provided on the Society's web site.

In 1985, a celebration of the 150th anniversary of the Society was hosted by the City Council in Glasgow City Chambers, attended by members, directors, grantees, pensioners, bursars, members of the City Council, and the Lord Lieutenant of Perth and Kinross.

Web Site
The Society web site contains up to date information about the Society, including the current Board of Directors, bursaries, and grants.

The Society's web site is currently maintained by one of the directors, Alastair F. Brown, and is hosted on BrownNet.

References

Charities based in Glasgow
1835 establishments in Scotland